Apastovo (Apas) is an urban locality (an urban-type settlement) and the administrative center of Apastovsky District of the Republic of Tatarstan, Russia, located  from the republic's capital of Kazan. As of the 2010 Census, its population was 5,145.

In 1992, the majority of the population was Tatar.

Geography
Apastovo lies on the Kazan–Ulyanovsk auto route,  of the republic's capital of Kazan, in the Sviyaga River valley,  from the main channel, on a small stream named Tabarka, which is a tributary of the Ulema River.

History
It has been known since the 17th century as Yenaleyevo. Apastovo served as the administrative center of Apastovsky District in 1930–1963, and again since March 4, 1964. Urban-type settlement status was granted to it on September 9, 2004.

Administrative and municipal status
Within the framework of administrative divisions, the urban-type settlement of Apastovo serves as the administrative center of Apastovsky District, of which it is a part. As a municipal division, Apastovo, together with one rural locality (the village of Starye Yenali), is incorporated within Apastovsky Municipal District as Apastovo Urban Settlement.

Economy
The industrial facilities in Apastovo include a bakery and a brick factory. Agricultural activities are focused on the dairy cattle breeding.

Culture
Apastovo is home to the Apastovsky Museum, which was established on December 31, 1991 and opened to public on November 1, 1993. The museum contains archaeological and paleontological finds in the area, including ancient tools, bone needles, stone hammers, a skull of a rhinoceros, mammoth teeth, and more. It also exhibits a collection of documents and photographs from the 19th and 20th century and provides an insight into the ethnography and everyday living of the Kazan Tatars.

References

Notes

Sources

Urban-type settlements in the Republic of Tatarstan
Tetyushsky Uyezd